Awaouichthys menoni is a species of goby native to the Sunderbans of India.  This species is the only known member of its genus.

References

Gobiidae
Taxa named by Tapan Kumar Chatterjee
Taxa named by Subhrendu Sekhar Mishra
Monotypic fish genera